Sacabamba is a town in the Cochabamba Department in central Bolivia. It is the capital of Sacabamba Municipality, the fourth municipal section of Esteban Arce Province. At the time of census 2001 it had a population of 636.

See also 
 Jatun Mayu

References

 Instituto Nacional de Estadistica de Bolivia

External links
 Map of Esteban Arce Province

Populated places in Cochabamba Department